Étienne Clavière (29 January 17358 December 1793) was a Genevan-born French financier and politician of the French Revolution. He was French Minister of Finance between 24 March and 12 June 1792, and between 10 August 1792 and 2 June 1793.

Geneva and London
A native of Geneva, Clavière became one of the democratic leaders of the Geneva Revolution of 1782. After its failure, he went into exile, becoming a financier in Paris in 1784. His brother moved to Brussels.

Clavière associated with personalities from Neuchâtel and Geneva, among them Jean-Paul Marat and Étienne Dumont. Their plans for a new Geneva in Ireland—which the government of William Pitt the Younger favoured—were given up when Jacques Necker came to power in France, and Clavière, with most of his comrades, settled in Paris. In 1785 he collaborated with Theophile Cazenove. In 1787 he visited the Dutch Republic, together with Jacques Pierre Brissot, and met with Pieter Stadnitski, a banker. The patriots were losing influence and territory and the French politicians went back.

French Revolution
In 1789, he and Dumont allied themselves with Honoré Mirabeau, secretly collaborating for him on the Courrier de Provence and also preparing speeches for Mirabeau to deliver—this association with Clavière sustained Mirabeau's reputation as a financier. He was one of the founding members of the Society of the Friends of the Blacks and of the Jacobin Club.

Clavière also published some pamphlets under his own name, and through these and his friendship with Jacques Pierre Brissot, whom he had met in London, he was Minister of Finance in the Girondist ministry, from 24 March to 12 June 1792 (as a suppleant member of the Legislative Assembly for Seine, and supported Brissot).

After 10 August (the storming of the Tuileries Palace) he was again given charge of the finances in the provisional executive council, but could not offer a remedy to France's difficulties, concerning the assignats. Clavière shared in the fall of the Girondins, being arrested on 2 June 1793, but was not placed on trial with the rest in October. He remained in prison until 8 December, when, on receiving notice that he was to appear on the next day before the Revolutionary Tribunal, he committed suicide.

References

Further reading
 Jean Marc Rivier, Étienne Clavière (1735–1793): un révolutionnaire, ami des Noirs (Panormitis, 2006) 

1735 births
1793 deaths
Politicians from the Republic of Geneva
18th-century businesspeople from the Republic of Geneva
Deputies to the French National Convention
French abolitionists
French financiers
French politicians who committed suicide
Suicides in France
French Ministers of Finance
People who committed suicide in prison custody
People who died in prison custody during the French Revolution
18th-century suicides
Girondins
Jacobins